Pradit Sawangsri is a professional footballer from Thailand. He currently plays for Police United FC in the Thailand Premier League.

He played for Krung Thai Bank FC in the 2008 AFC Champions League group stages.

References

1978 births
Living people
Pradit Sawangsri
Pradit Sawangsri
Pradit Sawangsri
Pradit Sawangsri
Pradit Sawangsri
Pradit Sawangsri
Association football defenders